Politics in Portugal operates as an unitary multi-party semi-presidential representative democratic republic, whereby the Prime Minister of Portugal is the head of government, and the President of Portugal is the non-executive head of state with several significant political powers they exercise often. Executive power is exercised by the Government, whose leader is the Prime Minister. Legislative power is primarily vested in the Assembly of the Republic (the Portuguese parliament), although the government is also able to legislate on certain matters. The Judiciary of Portugal is independent of the executive and the legislature. The President exerts a sort of "moderating power", not easily classified into any of the traditional three branches of government.

Since 1975, the party system has been dominated by the social democratic Socialist Party and the liberal-conservative Social Democratic Party.

Political background
The national and regional governments are dominated by two political parties,  Socialist Party (PS), a social democratic party that resembles British Labour or the German SPD, and the Social Democratic Party (PSD), a liberal-conservative party and member of the European Parliament's European People's Party group, which have similar basic policies in some respects: both are pro-Europe and support the market economy.  Other parties with seats in the parliament are CHEGA, the Portuguese Communist Party, the Left Bloc, the Ecologist Party "The Greens", Livre, and PAN. The Communists and the Greens are in coalition as the Unitary Democratic Coalition.

In the elections of 2011, the Social Democratic Party won enough seats to form a majority government with the People's Party. The coalition, led by Prime Minister Pedro Passos Coelho, was supported by a majority in the Parliament of 132 MPs. The major opposition party was the Socialist Party (the party of the former Prime Minister José Sócrates, in office 2005–2011) with 74 MPs. Also represented were the Portuguese Communist Party (16 MPs), "The Greens" (2 MPs) and the Left Bloc (8 MPs), all to the left of the governing coalition.

In the election of 2015, which the Social Democratic Party and People's Party contested as a coalition, Portugal Ahead, the government lost its absolute majority. The left-wing parties, the Socialist Party, Portuguese Communist Party, Ecologist Party "The Greens", and Left Bloc, argued that as they were willing to form a coalition which would have a majority in the assembly, they ought to be invited to form the government, while Portugal Ahead, as the largest grouping, argued that they should be invited to form the government. After three weeks of uncertainty, the President designated Passos Coelho as Prime Minister, which was followed by the formation of a minority government.  However, the Government Programme was rejected by the Parliament. It was the shortest-lived Portuguese national government since the Carnation Revolution. Since then the left-wing parties, led by the Socialist Party, have formed the government. On 26 November 2015, there was established a Socialist Party (PS) minority government led by Prime Minister António Costa.

In the Portuguese legislative election of 2019  the centre-left Socialist Party (PS) of incumbent Prime Minister Costa obtained the largest share of the vote, and the most seats. On 26 October 2019, there was established a new Socialist Party (PS) minority government led by Prime Minister António Costa. In the snap election of 2022 the ruling Socialist Party won an outright majority.

History

The first constitution was created in 1822 (following the Liberal Revolution of 1820), followed by a second in 1826, followed by a third in 1838 (after the Liberal Wars), a fourth in 1911 (following the 5 October 1910 revolution), and a fifth 1933 (after the 28 May 1926 coup d'état).

Portugal's 25 April 1976 constitution reflected the country's 1974–76 move from authoritarian rule to provisional military government to a representative democracy with some initial Communist and left-wing influence. The military coup in 1974, which became known as the Carnation Revolution, was a result of multiple internal and external factors like the colonial wars that ended in removing the dictator, Marcelo Caetano, from power.  The prospect of a communist takeover in Portugal generated considerable concern among the country's NATO allies.  The revolution also led to the country abruptly abandoning its colonies overseas and to the return of an estimated 600,000 Portuguese citizens from abroad. The 1976 constitution, which defined Portugal as a "Republic... engaged in the formation of a classless society," was revised in 1982, 1989, 1992, 1997, 2001, and 2004.

The 1982 revision of the constitution placed the military under strict civilian control, trimmed the powers of the president, and abolished the Revolutionary Council (a military body with legislative veto and quasi-judicial powers).  The country joined the European Union in 1986, beginning a path toward greater economic and political integration with its richer neighbors in Europe. The 1989 revision of the constitution eliminated much of the remaining Marxist rhetoric of the original document, abolished the communist-inspired "agrarian reform", and laid the groundwork for further privatization of nationalized firms and the government-owned communications media. The 1992 revision made it compatible with the Maastricht Treaty.

The current Portuguese constitution provides for progressive administrative decentralization and calls for future reorganization on a regional basis. The Azores and Madeira archipelagos have constitutionally mandated autonomous status. A regional autonomy statute promulgated in 1980 established the Government of the Autonomous Region of the Azores; the Government of the Autonomous Region of Madeira operates under a provisional autonomy statute in effect since 1976. Apart from the Azores and Madeira, the country is divided into 18 districts, each headed by a governor appointed by the Minister of Internal Administration. Macau, a former dependency, reverted to Chinese sovereignty in December 1999.

X, XI and XII Constitutional Governments (1985–1995)
The Social Democratic Party, under the leadership of Aníbal Cavaco Silva, rose to power after the 1985 legislative elections and formed a minority government. However, the government lost the confidence of Parliament in April 1987 after losing a non-confidence vote. After this, President Mário Soares called an early election for July 1987.

The 1987 early elections were held on 19 July and resulted in a landslide majority government for the Social Democrats, the first time a party won a majority on its own in democracy. The XI Constitutional Government, the first one to finish a full 4-year term in democracy, was sworn in on 17 August 1987. During this term, the PSD government initiated a big program of liberalization and privatization of several sectors of the economy.

In the 1991 election the Social Democrats were returned again to power and, also, with an absolute majority. It was the third consecutive election victoty for the PSD, a record in democracy. The XII Constitutional Government was sworn in on 31 October 1991. After 1992, the economy fell into a recession and despite the recession being over by mid 1994, the government was badly hit and Cavaco Silva decided to not run for a fourth term as Prime Minister. Cavaco Silva's 10-year tenure as Prime Minister is the longest, so far, in democracy.

XIII and XIV Constitutional Governments (1995–2002)
The Socialist Party, under the leadership of António Guterres, came to power following the October 1995 legislative elections. The Socialists later won a new mandate by winning exactly half the parliamentary seats in the October 1999 election, and constituting then the XIV Constitutional Government.  Socialist Jorge Sampaio won the February 1996 presidential elections with nearly 54% of the vote. Sampaio's election marked the first time since the 1974 revolution that a single party held the prime ministership, the presidency, and a plurality of the municipalities. Local elections were held in December 1997.

Prime Minister Guterres continued the privatization and modernization policies begun by his predecessor, Aníbal Cavaco Silva (in office 1985–1995) of the Social Democratic Party.  Guterres was a vigorous proponent of the effort to include Portugal in the first round of countries to collaborate and put into effect the euro in 1999. In international relations, Guterres pursued strong ties with the United States and greater Portuguese integration with the European Union while continuing to raise Portugal's profile through an activist foreign policy.  One of his first decisions as Prime Minister was to send 900 troops to participate in the IFOR peacekeeping mission in Bosnia.  Portugal later contributed 320 troops to SFOR, the follow-up Bosnia operation. Portugal also contributed aircraft and personnel to NATO's Operation Allied Force in Kosovo.

XV Constitutional Government (2002–2004)
The XV Constitutional Government was led by José Manuel Durão Barroso, leader of the Social Democratic Party in coalition with the People's Party, whose leader, Paulo Portas, became Minister of Defence.

XVI Constitutional Government (2004–2005)
After José Manuel Durão Barroso accepted the invitation to be the next European Commission President, a new government had to be formed. Though opposition parties called for general elections, President Jorge Sampaio named Pedro Santana Lopes, the new Social Democratic Party leader, as Prime Minister, who thus formed a new government, in coalition with the People's Party. However, in December 2004, due to several controversies involving the government, the President dissolved the parliament and called for early elections. Santana Lopes resigned after the announcement of the President's decision.

XVII and XVIII Constitutional Governments (2005–2011)
In the elections on 20 February, the Socialist Party obtained its largest victory ever, achieving an absolute majority for the first time in the party's history. Prime Minister José Sócrates was sworn in by President Jorge Sampaio on 12 March. To many's surprise, Sócrates formed a cabinet made up of roughly half senior members of the Socialist Party and half independents, notably including Diogo Freitas do Amaral, founder of the right wing People's Party, who assumed office as Ministry of Foreign Affairs (he later resigned due to personal issues).

In the elections on 27 September 2009,  The Socialist Party, led by incumbent Prime Minister José Sócrates, won the largest number of seats, but didn't repeat the overall majority they gained in 2005. Sócrates was reconducted but lost his majority. The 2010 European debt crisis led Portugal to ask for a bailout from the IMF and the European Union. This situation led to the resignation of José Sócrates as Prime Minister and the President dissolved the parliament and called for early elections.

XIX and XX Constitutional Governments (2011–2015)
In the elections held on 5 June 2011, the Social Democratic Party won enough seats to form a majority government with the People's Party. The Government was led by Pedro Passos Coelho. It had 11 ministers and was sworn in on 21 June.

The Portuguese legislative election of 2015 was held on 4 October. The results display a relative victory of the right-wing coalition, but they also display a combined victory of the left-wing parties (including the Socialist Party), with a hung parliament (a right-wing single winner and a left-wing majority parliament). After the election The XX Constitutional Government of Portugal had Pedro Passos Coelho (PSD) as the prime minister and lasted from 30 October 2015 to 26 November 2015. However, the Government Programme was rejected by the Parliament. It was the shortest-lived Portuguese national government since the Carnation Revolution.

XXI, XXII and XXIII Constitutitional Governments (2015–) 
The 21st cabinet of the Portuguese government since the establishment of the current constitution. It was established on 26 November 2015 as a Socialist Party (PS) minority government led by Prime Minister António Costa.

The Portuguese legislative election of 2019 was held on 6 October 2019. The centre-left Socialist Party (PS) of incumbent Prime Minister Costa obtained the largest share of the vote, and the most seats. The XXII Constitutional Government of Portugal is the current cabinet of the Portuguese government. It was established on 26 October 2019 as a Socialist Party (PS) minority government led by Prime Minister António Costa. In October 2021, the budget proposed by the government was rejected by Parliament, leading President Marcelo Rebelo de Sousa to call an early election for January 2022.

The 2022 early elections were held on 30 January 2022. The election resulted in an absolute majority for the Socialist Party, the second in its history. However, the government swearing in was postponed because of a rerun in the overseas constituency of Europe, and the XXIII Constitutitional Government, led by Prime Minister António Costa, was only sworn in on 30 March 2022.

Political powers
Government in Portugal is made up of three branches originally envisioned by enlightenment philosopher Baron de Montesquieu: executive, legislative, and judicial. Each branch is separate and is designed to keep checks and balances on the others. The President's powers, however, do not fall into either of the traditional three, forming instead a sort of "moderating power" over the legislature and the government.

The four main organs of the national government are the presidency, the prime minister and Council of Ministers (the government), the Assembly of the Republic (the parliament), and the judiciary.

President
The President, elected to a 5-year term by direct, universal suffrage, is also commander-in-chief of the armed forces. Presidential powers include appointing the Prime Minister and Council of Ministers, in which the President must be guided by the assembly election results; dismissing the Prime Minister; dissolving the assembly to call early elections; vetoing legislation, which may be overridden by the assembly; and declaring a state of war or siege.

The Council of State, a presidential advisory body, is composed of:
 The President of the Assembly of the Republic
 The Prime Minister of Portugal
 The President of the Constitutional Court of Portugal
 The Ombudsman of Portugal
 Both Presidents of the regional governments of the autonomous regions (Madeira and Azores)
 Former Presidents of the Republic
 Five citizens appointed by the President of the Republic
 Five citizens appointed by the Assembly of the Republic

The president, according to the election results, names the party that shall form a government, whose leader is appointed Prime Minister. The Prime Minister names the Council of Ministers, and the ministers name their Secretaries of State. A new government is required to define the broad outline of its policy in a program and present it to the assembly for a mandatory period of debate. Failure of the assembly to reject the program by a majority of deputies confirms the government in office.

|President
|Marcelo Rebelo de Sousa
|Social Democratic Party
|9 March 2016
|-
|Prime Minister
|António Costa
|Socialist Party
|26 November 2015
|}

Presidential elections

|-
!style="background-color:#E9E9E9;text-align:left;" colspan="2" rowspan="2"|Candidates 
!style="background-color:#E9E9E9;text-align:left;" rowspan="2"|Supporting parties 	
!style="background-color:#E9E9E9;text-align:right;" colspan="2"|First round
|-
!style="background-color:#E9E9E9;text-align:right;"|Votes
!style="background-color:#E9E9E9;text-align:right;"|%
|-
|style="width: 10px" bgcolor=#FF9900 align="center" | 
|align=left|Marcelo Rebelo de Sousa
|align=left|Social Democratic Party, People's Party
|align="right" |2,531,692
|align="right" |60.66
|-
|style="width: 5px" bgcolor=#FF66FF align="center" | 
|align=left|Ana Gomes
|align=left|People–Animals–Nature, LIVRE
|align="right" |540,823
|align="right" |12.96
|-
|style="width: 5px" bgcolor=#202056 align="center" | 
|align=left|André Ventura
|align=left|CHEGA
|align="right" |497,746
|align="right" |11.93
|-
|style="width: 5px" bgcolor=red align="center" | 
|align=left|João Ferreira
|align=left|Portuguese Communist Party, Ecologist Party "The Greens"
|align="right" |179,764
|align="right" |4.31
|-
|style="width: 5px" bgcolor= align="center" | 
|align=left|Marisa Matias
|align=left|Left Bloc, Socialist Alternative Movement
|align="right" |165,127
|align="right" |3.96
|-
|style="width: 5px" bgcolor=#00ADEF align="center" | 
|align=left|Tiago Mayan Gonçalves
|align=left|Liberal Initiative
|align="right" |134,991
|align="right" |3.23
|-
|style="width: 5px" bgcolor=LightSeaGreen align="center" | 
|align=left|Vitorino Silva
|align=left|React, Include, Recycle
|align="right" |123,031
|align="right" |2.95
|-
|colspan="3" align=left style="background-color:#E9E9E9"|Total valid
|width="65" align="right" style="background-color:#E9E9E9"|4,173,174
|width="40" align="right" style="background-color:#E9E9E9"|100.00
|-
|align=right colspan="3"|Blank ballots
|width="65" align="right" |47,164
|width="40" align="right" |1.11
|-
|align=right colspan="3" |Invalid ballots
|width="65" align="right"|38,018
|width="40" align="right"|0.89
|-
|colspan="3" align=left style="background-color:#E9E9E9"|Total
|width="65" align="right" style="background-color:#E9E9E9"|4,258,356
|width="40" align="right" style="background-color:#E9E9E9"|
|-
|colspan=3|Registered voters/turnout
||10,847,434||39.26
|-
|colspan=5 align=left|Source: Comissão Nacional de Eleições
|}

Executive branch
Executive power is exercised by the Government of Portugal. The Government is formed after the President appoints the Prime Minister based on election results, as described earlier – traditionally, the leader of the most voted party.

The Government can only remain in place for as long as the Parliament allows: the Parliament can remove the Government at the beginning by approving a motion of rejection to the introductory Government programme, or at any time by approving a motion of no confidence, either of which is achieved by a simple majority; the Government may also, of its own initiative, choose to present at any time a motion of confidence, which acts as the opposite of a motion of no confidence: if rejected, the Government is removed. Finally, the Government also relies on Parliament to approve the state budget, which also allows Parliament to indirectly force the Government to resign by rejecting its budget proposal. Thus, the Government, although not directly elected, is held accountable before Parliament, which is proportionally representative of the people. Typically, once the Government is removed from office, the President will call a snap election (also known as an early election).

Legislative branch
Legislative power is exercised by the Assembly of the Republic, which is the parliament of Portugal, although the Government also has a more limited ability to legislate on some matters (on others, Parliament has exclusive legislative competence). It is also the body which holds the Government accountable and has the means to remove it from office at any time, as described earlier, primarily through a motion of no confidence, although alternative methods exist.

The Assembly of the Republic is a unicameral body composed of 230 deputies (that is, members of parliament). Elected by universal suffrage according to a system of proportional representation, deputies serve terms of office of 4 years, unless the president dissolves the assembly and calls for new elections. According to the constitution, members of the assembly represent the entire country, not the constituency from which they are elected.

Political parties in legislative elections

Judicial branch
The national Supreme Court is the court of last appeal. Military, administrative, and fiscal courts are designated as separate court categories. A thirteen-member Constitutional Court reviews the constitutionality of legislation.

Administrative divisions

18 districts (distritos, singular distrito) and 2 autonomous regions* (regiões autónomas, singular região autónoma): Aveiro, Açores (Azores)*, Beja, Braga, Bragança, Castelo Branco, Coimbra, Évora, Faro, Guarda, Leiria, Lisboa, Madeira*, Portalegre, Porto, Santarém, Setúbal, Viana do Castelo, Vila Real, Viseu

Historical rankings of prime ministers
In 2012 and 2014 newspaper i and the polling agency Pitagórica conducted polls asking for the best Portuguese prime minister among the seven most recent ones (i.e. in the previous 30 years). The results revealed that the public clearly separated the seven evaluated prime ministers between the three best ones (each receiving more than 20% of the votes) and the four worst (each receiving from 4 to 8% of the votes). In both polls, António Guterres (1995–2002) ranked as the best prime minister. Mário Soares (1976–78 and 1983–85) and Aníbal Cavaco Silva (1985–95) were also among the best prime ministers. On the other hand, José Manuel Durão Barroso (2002–04), Pedro Santana Lopes (2004–05), José Sócrates (2005–11) and Pedro Passos Coelho (2011–15, incumbent at the time of the polls) ranked as the worst prime ministers. Pedro Santana Lopes was ranked the worst in the 2012 poll while Barroso ranked as the worst in the 2014 one. Together, the three best prime ministers ruled Portugal uninterruptedly from 1983 to 2002, while the four worst ruled from 2002 to 2015.

i/Pitagórica (2012) 
 António Guterres – 27%
 Aníbal Cavaco Silva – 24%
 Mário Soares – 23%
 Pedro Passos Coelho – 8%
 José Manuel Durão Barroso – 8%
 José Sócrates – 6%
 Pedro Santana Lopes – 4%

i/Pitagórica (2014) 
The poll was conducted in March 2014 and had 506 pollees.
 António Guterres – 24.4%
 Mário Soares – 23.9%
 Aníbal Cavaco Silva – 23.6%
 José Sócrates – 7.7%
 Pedro Santana Lopes – 6.9%
 Pedro Passos Coelho – 6.8%
 José Manuel Durão Barroso – 6.7%

See also

Assembly of the Republic
Foreign relations of Portugal
Member of the European Parliament
Sinistrisme
Politics of France (similar system of Government)
Politics of Romania (similar system of Government)

Notes

References

External links

Portuguese government website
Associação portuguesa de ciência política
Election results
Comissão Nacional de Eleições